Maucherite is a grey to reddish silver white nickel arsenide mineral. It crystallizes in the tetragonal crystal system. It occurs in hydrothermal veins alongside other nickel arsenide and sulfide minerals. It is metallic and opaque with a hardness of 5 and a specific gravity of 7.83. It is also known as placodine and Temiskamite. The unit cell is of symmetry group P41212 or P43212. 

It has the chemical formula: Ni11As8 and commonly contains copper, iron, cobalt, antimony, and sulfur as impurities.

It was discovered in 1913 in Eisleben, Germany and was named after Wilhelm Maucher (1879–1930), a German mineral collector.

References 

Mindat localities
 

Nickel minerals
Arsenide minerals
Tetragonal minerals
Minerals in space group 92
Minerals in space group 96